José Jeunechamps (born 2 May 1967) is a Belgian professional football manager and former player who played as a goalkeeper. He is currently unemployed after most recently managing of Belgian Pro League club Seraing.

External links 

 
 

1967 births
Living people
People from Verviers
Belgian footballers
Association football goalkeepers
Belgian football managers
Association football coaches
R.F.C. Seraing (1904) non-playing staff
Standard Liège non-playing staff
FC Metz non-playing staff
Charlton Athletic F.C. non-playing staff
R.F.C. Seraing (1922) managers
Standard Liège managers
Cercle Brugge K.S.V. non-playing staff
Cercle Brugge K.S.V. managers
Oud-Heverlee Leuven non-playing staff
Royal Antwerp F.C. non-playing staff
Royal Excel Mouscron non-playing staff
Royal Excel Mouscron managers
Belgian First Division B managers
Belgian expatriate football managers
Expatriate football managers in France
Expatriate football managers in Belgium
Belgian expatriate sportspeople in France
Belgian expatriate sportspeople in England
Footballers from Liège Province